The 2008 Asian Artistic Gymnastics Championships were the 4th edition of the Asian Artistic Gymnastics Championships, and were held in Doha, Qatar from November 15 to November 18, 2008.

Medal summary

Men

Women

Medal table

Participating nations 
129 athletes from 20 nations competed.

 (8)
 (4)
 (12)
 (6)
 (5)
 (12)
 (3)
 (7)
 (3)
 (4)
 (8)
 (2)
 (2)
 (4)
 (12)
 (11)
 (6)
 (10)
 (4)
 (6)

References
 Men's Results
 Women's Results
 Complete Results

A
Asian Gymnastics Championships
Asian Gymnastics Championships
International gymnastics competitions hosted by Qatar
Gymnastics competitions in Qatar